Franklin Adams may refer to:

Franklin O. Adams (1881–1967), architect in Tampa, Florida
Franklin P. Adams (1881–1960), American columnist
Franklin Robert Adams (1933–1990), American science fiction writer

See also
1925 Franklin-Adams, main belt asteroid
Frank Adams (disambiguation)